The Emperor (IV) is the fourth trump or Major Arcana card in traditional tarot decks. It is used in game playing as well as in divination.

Description 
The Emperor sits on a ram-adorned throne, a symbol of Mars. Another ram head can be seen on his cloak. His long white beard bears the symbol of "wisdom". He holds an Ankh scepter in his right hand, and a globe, symbol of domination, in his left. The Emperor sits atop a stark, barren mountain, a sign of "sterility of regulation, and unyielding power." He symbolizes the top of the secular hierarchy, the ultimate male ego.  The Emperor is the absolute ruler of the world.

History 
The essential features of the design for The Emperor card have changed very little through the centuries.  The Emperor sometimes got caught up in the censorship placed on the Popess (The High Priestess) and the Pope (The Hierophant), as when the Bolognese card makers replaced the Popess (High Priestess), Pope (Hierophant), Empress, and Emperor with four Moors or Turks. In the Minchiate, the first of the two Emperors are assigned number III because of the removal of the Popess (High Priestess) from the deck.

Interpretation 
According to A.E. Waite's 1910 book Pictorial Key to the Tarot, the Emperor card carries several divinatory associations:
4. THE EMPEROR.--Stability, power, protection, logic, realization; a great person; aid, reason, conviction also authority and will. Reversed: Benevolence, compassion, credit; also confusion to enemies, obstruction, immaturity. 
In astrology, the Emperor is associated with the planet Mars and Aries zodiac sign or the planet Saturn and Capricorn sun sign.

Alternative decks 
Alternative decks include:
The parallel, fourth Major Arcana card in the Osho Zen Tarot deck is called The Rebel, and carries some similar connotations.
In the Vikings tarot Ullr depicts the Emperor. He is shown with a bow, a pair of skis, a shield, and a sleigh.
In the X/1999 tarot version made by CLAMP, The Emperor is Kyougo Monou.
In The Legend of the Legendary Heroes tarot, The Emperor is Sion Astarl.
In the Mythic Tarot deck, the Emperor is depicted by Zeus.
In the Wildwood Tarot by Mark Ryan, this card is called "The Green Man".

References 

Major Arcana